Peder Pedersen (3 November 1945 – 9 January 2015) was a Danish track cyclist who won a gold medal in the team pursuit at the 1968 Olympics. He also competed in the sprint at the 1964, 1968 and 1972 Summer Olympics, but failed to reach the final. He was selected at the Olympic flag bearer for Denmark in 1972.

Pedersen won two medals in the sprint at the amateur world championships in 1969–70. After the 1972 Olympics he turned professional and won the 1974 world sprint title, finishing second in 1975. Domestically he held 11 Danish titles, mostly in the sprint. After retiring from competitions he coached the national cycling team in 1977–92. He was also a board member of the Danish Cycling Union in 1977–90 and served as its president in 1991–2005. From 1993 to 1997 he was a board member of the Union Cycliste Internationale. Pedersen was a policeman by profession, and at some point in his life headed the traffic police in Fünen.

References

External links
 

1945 births
2015 deaths
Danish male cyclists
Olympic cyclists of Denmark
Olympic gold medalists for Denmark
Olympic medalists in cycling
Cyclists at the 1964 Summer Olympics
Cyclists at the 1968 Summer Olympics
Cyclists at the 1972 Summer Olympics
Medalists at the 1968 Summer Olympics
UCI Track Cycling World Champions (men)
Danish track cyclists
Sportspeople from the Region of Southern Denmark